Tech College Aalborg is a school in the city of Aalborg, in North Jutland in Denmark. It offers a wide spectrum of vocational training and runs Aalborg Tekniske Gymnasium. The school has about 4500 yearly students and 650 employees.

Departments 
TECHCOLLEGE is made of several departments in Aalborg.

Aalborg Tekniske Gymnasium (English: Aalborg Technical Gymnasium) is a part of TECHCOLLEGE. The gymnasium has about eleven classes each year, which is spread out on Øster Uttrup Vej 5 and Nyhavnsgade 14, both in Aalborg.

External links

Secondary schools in Denmark
Education in Aalborg
Vocational secondary education in Denmark